Jasna may refer to:

Places
 Jasna, a village in Poland
 Jasná, a village and ski resort in Slovakia

Other uses
 Jasna (given name), a Slavic female given name
 JASNA, the Jane Austen Society of North America

See also
 Yasna, a concept in Zoroastrianism